Cengiz Dağcı (9 March 1919 – 22 September 2011) was a Crimean Tatar novelist and poet. He wrote his works in Turkish, despite having never been in Turkey. He wrote about twenty novels about his life and his Motherland — Crimea.

He was born in Gurzuf, Crimea, but grew up in Kızıltaş village (now Krasnokamianka). His first two poems were published in the Crimean newspaper in 1936. He entered Simferopol Pedagogical Institute in 1937. However, he did not graduate from it because of mobilizing to the Red Army in 1940. He was taken hostage by the Nazis in 1941 and survived Nazi labour camps. In 1946, Dağcı and Regina, his wife, settled in London, where he would live until his death. He began to write novels in Turkish in 1958. His novel "Letters to my mother" was named "the best novel" by the Turkish Writers' Union in 1988. The Turkish Society of Scientists and Writers awarded him for outstanding contributions to Turkic literature in 1993. Cengiz Dağcı died on 22 September 2011 at his home. In accordance of his last will, he was buried in Kızıltaş, Crimea. The funeral service in Simferopol was attended by a large delegation of Turkish officials, as well as by the Foreign Minister of Turkey, Ahmet Davutoğlu.

External links 
 Biography, Ötüken Publishing 
 "Türk edebiyatının acı kaybı", Anadolu Ajansı 
 Cengiz Dağcı 

1919 births
2011 deaths
British people of Crimean Tatar descent
Crimean Tatar writers
Writers from London
People from Yalta
Soviet emigrants to the United Kingdom
British male poets
British male novelists
20th-century British poets
20th-century British novelists
20th-century English male writers